Axis of Justice is a non-profit organization co-founded by Serj Tankian and Tom Morello. Its purpose is to bring together musicians, fans of music, and grassroots progressivism to fight for social justice together.

Formation
In a 2007 interview, Tom Morello remarked that he formed Axis of Justice with Serj Tankian after witnessing some members of the audience at Ozzfest 2002 promoting racist symbols and imagery. In an effort to promote an adamant anti-racist and anti-fascist message, Axis of Justice allied with Anti-Racist Action shortly after its formation.

Axis of Justice tents appeared at music festivals where either Audioslave (now defunct) or System of a Down were playing, as it did at Lollapalooza 2003. The Axis of Justice also puts out a monthly radio show that can be heard on Pacifica Radio station KPFK (90.7 FM) in Los Angeles, California, and on XM Satellite Radio. The shows are archived in MP3 format on the AOJ website and are available as free downloads. They also have a number of books on their website that they recommend to support their views.

In 2004, they released a live album/DVD entitled Axis of Justice: Concert Series Volume 1. It contains performances by Flea from Red Hot Chili Peppers, Brad Wilk from Rage Against the Machine, Chris Cornell of Soundgarden and Audioslave, Serj Tankian from System of a Down, Corey Taylor of Slipknot and Stone Sour, Pete Yorn, Tim Walker, Maynard James Keenan of Tool, A Perfect Circle and Puscifer, and Wayne Kramer among others. It was recorded during a concert at the Avalon in Los Angeles. The concert was a benefit to raise money for the Axis of Justice and a variety of causes.

Members 
Serj Tankian – lead vocals, piano
Tom Morello – guitars, vocals

Performers 

Tim McIlrath –  lead vocals
Flea – bass
Brad Wilk – drums
Pete Yorn – guitars, vocals
Tim Walker – guitars, pedal steel
Maynard James Keenan – vocals
Buckethead – multi-instrumentalist
Slash – lead guitar
Jonny Polonsky – keyboards, bass
Chris Cornell – lead vocal
Taylor Hawkins – drums
Dave Grohl – drums, vocals, guitar
Trent Reznor – lead vocals
Krist Novoselic – bass
Dave Catching – guitar
Mike McCready – guitar
Mike Mills – bass
Billy Corgan – vocals, guitar
James Iha – guitar
Jeff Ament – bass
Josh Freese – drums
Duff Mckagan – bass, guitar, vocals
Perry Farrell – vocals
John Frusciante – guitar
Jerry Cantrell – guitar
Mike Inez – bass
Daron Malakian – guitar
Daniel Rey – guitar
Chad Smith – drums
Mike Watt – bass
Pat Smear – guitar
Jimmy Page – guitar
John Paul Jones – bass
Jeff Beck – guitar
Josh Homme -rhythm guitar
Stephen Perkins – drums
Corey Taylor – lead vocals
Simon Petty – guitars
Zack De La Rocha – lead vocal
Keith Levene – lead guitar
Scott Weiland – lead vocals
Malcolm Cross – drums, percussion, piano
Travis Barker – drums
Dez Cadena – guitar
Matt Sorum – drums
Gilby Clarke – guitar
Sean Kinney – drums
Stone Gossard – guitar
Kim Gordon – vocals
Lemmy Kilmister – vocals, bass
Kim Thayil – guitar
Alan White – drums
Matt Cameron – drums
Jimmy Chamberlin – drums
Ben Shepherd – bass
J Mascis – guitar
John Fogerty – guitar, vocals
Eddie Vedder – vocals
Dave Kushner – guitar
Art Karamian – guitar, vocals
David Hakopyan – bass guitar
Sammy J. Watson – drums
Lenny Castro – percussion
Kenny Aronoff – drums
Iggy Pop – vocals
Tim Commerford – bass
Stu Cook – bass
Martyn LeNoble – bass
Alfredo Hernandez – percussion
Nate Mendel – drums
Alice Cooper – vocals
Rick Parasher – keyboard, organ
Mark Lanegan – vocals
Maz Jobrani – comedian
Sid Jordan – bass, piano
Joe Mora – guitars
Wayne Kramer – guitars, vocals
John Dolmayan – drums
Jurassic 5 – vocals
Knowledge – spoken word
Brian O'Connor – bass
Ahmed Ahmed – comedian
Boots Riley – vocals

Discography
Axis of Justice: Concert Series Volume 1 (2004)

References

American social activists
American anti-racism activists
Musical advocacy groups
Non-profit organizations based in Los Angeles
Political advocacy groups in the United States
Columbia Records artists
American political activists
Serj Tankian
Music organizations based in the United States